Caravan or caravans may refer to:

Transport and travel
Caravan (travellers), a group of travellers journeying together
Caravanserai, a place where a caravan could stop
Camel train, a convoy using camels as pack animals
Convoy, a group of vehicles or ships traveling together for mutual support
Caravan (towed trailer), a self-contained trailer based camper or recreational vehicle containing beds, a kitchenette, dining and storage areas; chiefly British usage
Campervan, a type of vehicle
Caravan Tours, an escorted tour company
Central American migrant caravans
Vardo (Romani wagon), or caravan, a horse-drawn wagon used by British Romanichal Travellers as their home.

Automobile models
Dodge Caravan
Nissan Caravan
Chevrolet Caravan, a two-door station wagon sold by GM do Brasil
 Caravan, a station wagon body style (term used by the German manufacturer Opel)

Aeroplane models
Cessna 208 Caravan, a turboprop, high wing, utility airplane produced by Cessna Aircraft Company
Curtiss-Wright C-76 Caravan, an American 1940s medium military transport aircraft

Entertainment

Film and television
 Caravan (1934 film), an American musical starring Charles Boyer and Loretta Young
 Caravan (1946 film), a British drama starring Stewart Granger
 Caravan (1971 film), an Indian film directed by Nasir Hussain
 Caravan, working title for the 2019 film Roads, directed by Sebastian Schipper
 Caravan (TV series), a Canadian children's television series
 Caravans (film), a 1978 film based on the James A. Michener novel
 Himalaya (film), a 1999 Nepalese film also known as Caravan

Music
 Caravan (band), a progressive rock band and part of the Canterbury scene
 Caravan (Thai band), a Thai folk-rock band
 Caravan (Caravan album), the 1968 debut album by Caravan
 Caravan (Art Blakey album), a 1962 album by jazz musician Art Blakey
 "Caravan" (Rush song), a 2010 song by Rush
 "Caravan" (Juan Tizol and Duke Ellington song), a 1936 jazz standard
 "Caravan" (Van Morrison song), a 1970 song written by Van Morrison
 Caravan, a 2000 album by Kronos Quartet
 "Caravan", a song by Susumu Hirasawa on the 1995 album Sim City
 "Caravan", a song by Inspiral Carpets from their album The Beast Inside
 "Caravan", a song by Utopia from their 1980 album Adventures in Utopia
 "Caravan Song", a song by Mike Batt recorded by Barbara Dickson
 The Caravans, an American gospel music group, founded in 1947

Publishing
 Caravan (magazine), a UK monthly consumer magazine for the touring caravan community
 Caravan (novel), a 1942 novel by Lady Eleanor Smith
 Caravans (novel), a 1963 novel by James A. Michener
 Caravan (publishing), an Iranian publishing house
 Caravans (Al-Qadim), an accessory for the second edition of the Advanced Dungeons & Dragons fantasy role-playing game
 Caravan, a 1975 novel by Stephen Goldin

Video games
 Caravan, a playable card game in Fallout: New Vegas

Other
 Caravan (Israel), an Israeli term referring to a portable building
 Caravan (scouting), a Scout-like organizations in the United States
 Caravan or Mudhol Hound, a type of dog breed

See also
Van, a type of road vehicle used for transporting goods or people